Ivo Scapolo (born 24 July 1953) is an Italian prelate of the Catholic Church who has worked in the diplomatic service of the Holy See since 1984, and has served as nuncio in Bolivia, Rwanda, Chile and Portugal. He has been an archbishop since 2002.

Education and Priestly Service
Ivo Scapolo was born 24 July 1953 in Terrassa Padovana, Province of Padua. He was ordained a priest on 4 June 1978 in Padua. After earning a doctorate in canon law, he entered the diplomatic service of the Holy See on 1 May 1984. He filled positions in the offices representing the Holy See in Angola, Portugal, and the United States, and worked in Rome in the Section for Relations with States of the Secretariat of State.

Diplomatic career

On 26 March 2002, Pope John Paul II named him Apostolic Nuncio to Bolivia and titular archbishop of Tagaste. He received his episcopal consecration on 12 May from Cardinal Angelo Sodano. On 17 January 2008, Pope Benedict XVI named him Apostolic Nuncio to Rwanda, and on 15 July 2011 Apostolic Nuncio to Chile.

Chile
Scapolo played little role in resolving the clerical abuse crisis that brought intense Vatican scrutiny to Chile and the early retirement of several bishops. Several victims of clerical sexual abuse claimed he had long participated in preventing their claims from being heard. One of them, Juan Carlos Cruz, complained that Scapolo never met with victims of abuse and described him as "a blind guy, who does not hear the victims or have an interest in them".

Scapolo defended his role in the 2015 appointment of Juan Barros Madrid to be Bishop of Osorno, saying no information had been withheld from Vatican authorities. Nevertheless, Father Sergio Perez de Arce, whom Pope Francis named Apostolic Administrator of San Bartolome de Chillán as part of his reform of the Chilean hierarchy, said Scapolo "has not been and will not be the person with the sensitivity and skills needed to support a church in crisis like the Chilean one".

When Chile inaugurated its president in March 2018, the Holy See was represented by both Scapolo and Nicola Girasoli, the Apostolic Nuncio to Peru, which, according to La Tercera, church observers read as a sign that Scapolo was out of favor with the Vatican.

He received criticism in Chile for his link to controversial Bishop appointments, including the appointment of Madrid, who was criticized for his connection to Fr. Fernando Karadima, who had been accused by multiple people of sexual misconduct. Some alleged victims claimed that Barros was present during Karadima's sexual acts, with one even saying that he participated in them.

Sexual abuse scandal 
Regarding the sexual abuse scandals in Chile, Scapolo stated that it was "painful to see a reality of abuses in the Church" and the he "we should all feel anger, pain and shame if someone commits an abuse, even more if it is against a minor, and moreover if it is committed by a person who, like the priest, has a special responsibility."

After the Pope's visit to Chile Scapolo admitted that he faced "an avalanche of denunciations, petitions and complaints" and that he thinks he has "done what is humanly possible to face it. I tried to act in accordance with the truth, justice and charity."

Portugal 
Pope Francis named him Apostolic Nuncio to Portugal on 29 August 2019.

His appointment to the diplomatic post in Portugal was well received by the Portuguese Episcopal Conference who welcomed the appointment and wished to Bishop Ivo Scapolo “a fruitful pastoral ministry as representative of the Holy See to the Church in Portugal and in diplomatic relations with the Portuguese State”. In a note sent to the Portuguese catholic news agency, ECCLESIA, the Portuguese Episcopal Conference also expressed hope that Bishop Scapolo exercised his duties as a "Man of God, of the Church, of apostolic zeal, of reconciliation, of the Pope, of initiative, obedience, prayer, active charity, humility."

Views

Role of women 
When asked about the importance of the role of women in the Catholic Church and whether their role should be reviewed and re-analyzed, Scapolo stated his experience and time spent in Chile where women give a big contribution to Christian communities. Furthermore, Scapolo states that the Church is born when Mary says "yes" and therefore he expected that the role and responsibility of women in the catholic Church should be reflected upon.

See also
 List of heads of the diplomatic missions of the Holy See

References 

1953 births
Living people
People from the Province of Padua
Apostolic Nuncios to Bolivia
Apostolic Nuncios to Rwanda
Apostolic Nuncios to Chile
Apostolic Nuncios to Portugal
21st-century Italian Roman Catholic titular archbishops